San Nicolas Airport  is an airport serving the town of Mendoza in the Amazonas Region of Peru. The runway is just west of the town, at the adjoining village of San Nicolas.

Airlines and Destinations

See also

Transport in Peru
List of airports in Peru

References

External links
OpenStreetMap - San Nicolas
OurAirports - San Nicolas
SkyVector - San Nicolas

Airports in Peru
Buildings and structures in Amazonas Region